Take Refuge in Clean Living is the fourth studio album by American experimental rock band Grails, released on Important Records in 2008.

Track listing
All songs written by Grails, except Track 3, which is written by The Ventures.

Personnel
Grails
Emil Amos – Synthesizer, Piano, Zither, Vocals, Guitar
Alex Hall – Guitar, Sampler
Zak Riles – Pedal Steel Guitar, Guitar, Baglama
William Slater – Bass, Organ, Harpsichord, Guitar, Harmonium, Vocals
Ben Nugent – Drums
Kate O'Brien-Clarke - Strings
Cory Gray – Horns

References

2008 albums
Grails (band) albums